Ahmed Al-Zaaq is a Saudi Arabian football player who plays as a wigner .

External links

2009-10 Profile at slstat.com
2010-11 Profile at slstat.com
2012-13 Profile at slstat.com

1989 births
Living people
Saudi Arabian footballers
Al-Raed FC players
Damac FC players
Al-Orobah FC players
Al-Shoulla FC players
Al-Riyadh SC players
Al-Hazem F.C. players
Al-Arabi SC (Saudi Arabia) players
Al-Asyah Club players
Place of birth missing (living people)
Saudi First Division League players
Saudi Professional League players
Saudi Second Division players
Saudi Fourth Division players
Association football forwards